Telipna cameroonensis, the Cameroon telipna, is a butterfly in the family Lycaenidae. It is found in south-eastern Nigeria, western Cameroon, the Republic of the Congo and Gabon. The habitat consists of forests.

References

Butterflies described in 1969
Poritiinae